Forest Lawn Cemetery is a historic rural cemetery in Buffalo, New York, founded in 1849 by Charles E. Clarke. Forest Lawn is on the National Register of Historic Places.

Overview
Since its inception, Forest Lawn has served as a cemetery, park, arboretum, crematory and outdoor museum. Monuments, mausoleums and sculptures have attracted visitors for over 150 years. The first sculpture of Seneca Indian chief Red Jacket was erected in 1851. Red Jacket is depicted wearing the richly embroidered scarlet coat presented to him by a British officer, while on his breast is displayed the large silver peace medal awarded to him by President George Washington.

Every summer Forest Lawn offers "Sundays in the Cemetery" tours, each with a particular theme. Past examples have included the Pan-American Exposition Trolley Tour, Forest Lawn History Trolley Tour, Forest Lawn History Walk, Civil War Bus Tour and the Forest Lawn Nature Walk.

Margaret L. Wendt Archive and Research Center
In 2014, the  Margaret L. Wendt Archive and Resource Center opened within the cemetery.  It is a digitized history center, of interment records maintained since 1849, that features a number of interpretive displays highlighting the notable citizens buried in the cemetery. The building features climate controlled rooms and the design of the building mimics some of the historic structure that once stood at the same site. The staff includes Sandy Starks (Interpretive Program Director),  John Edens and  Lydia Ortiz. Construction and funding for the Center was provided by The Margaret L. Wendt Foundation along with support from The John R. Oishei Foundation.

Mausoleums
In 2004, Frank Lloyd Wright’s 1928 design for the Blue Sky Mausoleum was realized. The Mausoleum contains 24 crypts, which can be purchased and memorialized by individual owners. The Blue Sky Mausoleum is one of three Frank Lloyd Wright memorial sculptures in the world.  Sculptor David P. Dowler created a Steuben Glass piece in a limited edition of 26, of which 24 are reserved for those who purchase crypts in the Mausoleum.  Crypt clients also receive a copy of architectural historian Richard O. Reisem's 2005 book, Blue Sky Mausoleum of Frank Lloyd Wright.

Other mausoleums in the cemetery include:

 Burgess-Little Mausoleum – designed by H. H. (Henry Harrison) Little.
 Butler Mausoleum – constructed for Edward H. Butler, proprietor of the Buffalo Evening News.
 Buswell-Hochstetter Mausoleum
 Good Mausoleum – constructed for Daniel B. Good, who established the Seibert-Good Company in Chicago, which later consolidated with the Seymour H. Knox stores of Buffalo, N.Y. and finally amalgamated with the F.W. Woolworth Company.
 Goodyear (Frank) Mausoleum – constructed for Frank Henry Goodyear, who, with his brother, Charles W. Goodyear, started the Buffalo and Susquehanna Railroad.
 Kellner Mausoleum – constructed for John. S. Kellner, president of the Crystal Ice and Storage Company.
 Knox Mausoleum – constructed for Seymour H. Knox I, co-founder of F. W. Woolworth Company.
 Laub Mausoleum
 Letchworth-Skinner Mausoleum –
 Mitchel H. Mark Mausoleum – constructed for Mitchell Mark, founder of the Vitascope Theater Company
 Oberkircher Mausoleum – constructed for Caroline Oberkircher and family.
 Pierce (George) Mausoleum – constructed for George N. Pierce who co-founded a company known as Heinz, Pierce and Munshauer for the manufacture of refrigerators, birdcages, iceboxes and bathtubs, until leaving to establish the Pierce Cycle Company, which later became the Pierce-Arrow Motor Car Co.
 Stachura Mausoleum – constructed for Chester and Gloria Stachura.
 Steuernagel Mausoleum – constructed for John Steuernagel, president and board chairman of Kleinhans department store.
 Vars Mausoleum – designed by Lawrence Bley and Duane Lyman. Interred are Harry Thorp Vars, Gertrude Waltho Vars, Mary G. Vars, Addison Foster Vars, Addison F. Vars Jr., Aline Vars, Carlton J. Balliett, Evelyn Waltho Balliett Jr., Rose Waltho Brown, Bertha W. Barker, and Estelle Noell Reavis.
 Walden-Myer Mausoleum – designed by Richard A. Waite for Buffalo's mayor from 1838–39, Ebenezer Walden, and son-in law, Albert J. Myer, recognized by many as the "founder and father" of the US Weather Bureau.
 Willams-Pratt Mausoleum

Gallery

Others buried here

 John J. Albright (1848–1931), American businessman and philanthropist
 Lewis F. Allen (1800–1890), American politician and land developer
 Major Andre Andrews (1792–1834), 2nd Mayor of Buffalo
 William Farquhar Barry (1818–1879), U.S. Civil War general
 Hiram Barton (1810–1880), Mayor of Buffalo, 1849–50, 1852–53
 Lyman K. Bass (1836–1889), member of the U.S. House of Representatives
 Philip Becker (1830–1898), Mayor of Buffalo, 1876–77, 1886–89
 Al Boasberg (1891–1937), comedy writer
 Louise Blanchard Bethune (1856–1913), first female architect
 Daniel D. Bidwell Civil War brigadier general
 John Brent, first African-American professional architect in Buffalo
 Thomas A. Budd (1818–1862), US Navy officer.
 Willis Carrier, inventor of modern air conditioning
 Stephen Champlin, US Navy officer
 Shirley Chisholm, American politician, educator, and author
 George William Clinton, Mayor of Buffalo
 Eli Cook, Mayor of Buffalo, 1853, 1854–55
 Frederick Cook, explorer, physician, and ethnographer
 Lewis P. Dayton, Mayor of Buffalo, 1874–75
 William Dorsheimer, United States Congressman and Lt. Governor of New York State.
 William Fargo, Mayor of Buffalo, 1862–65
 Abigail Fillmore, wife of U.S. President Millard Fillmore
 Caroline C. Fillmore, second wife of U.S. President Millard Fillmore
 Barbara Siggers Franklin, mother of singer Aretha Franklin
 Dorothy Goetz, first wife of Irving Berlin
 Townsend Griffiss, first US aviator killed in Europe in World War II, 1900–1942 (cenotaph, body not recovered)
 Anna Katharine Green, American poet and novelist
 Anson Goodyear, first president of the Museum of Modern Art
 Charles W. Goodyear, co-founder of the Great Southern Lumber Company
 Nathan K. Hall, member of the U.S. House of Representatives
 Samuel P. Heintzelman, Civil War major general
 E.F. "Tommy" Hughitt, 1920s NFL quarterback, politician and auto salesman
 Red Jacket, Native American Seneca orator and chief of the Wolf clan.
 Martha Jackson, art dealer, founder of the Martha Jackson Gallery
 Edwin Jaeckle,  New York Republican State Chairman 1940–44
 Rick James (1948–2004), American musician and composer
 Edward Austin Kent, Buffalo architect who perished aboard the RMS Titanic (1854–1912)
 Jesse Ketchum, Canadian politician and tannery owner in Toronto and Buffalo
 William Ketchum, Mayor of Buffalo, 1844–45
 Northrup R. Knox, Founder of the Buffalo Sabres, banker and community leader
 Seymour H. Knox I, businessman, co-founder of F.W. Woolworth Company
 John D. Larkin, owner and founder of the Larkin mail order company, 1845–1926
 Stanford Lipsey (1927–2016), newspaper publisher
 Timothy T. Lockwood, Mayor of Buffalo, 1858–59
 John C. Lord, Presbyterian minister and activist
 George Maltby Love, 1831–1887 Civil War Medal of Honor Recipient
 Louis W. Marcus (1863–1923), Justice of the New York Supreme Court
 Mitchell Mark, pioneer of motion picture exhibition
 Darwin D. Martin, Larkin Company executive and commissioner of the Darwin D. Martin House
 Joseph G. Masten, Mayor of Buffalo, 1843–44 & 1845–46
 William McMillan, Buffalo's first Superintendent of Parks.
 Henry Moxley, African-American businessman, religious leader and activist
 Albert J. Myer  father of the U.S. Army Signal Corps
 Dr. Roswell Park, founder of Roswell Park Comprehensive Cancer Center
 Ely S. Parker, Seneca attorney, engineer, and tribal diplomat
 Ralph Peo, Founder of Frontier Industries, CEO & Chairman of Houdaille Industries
 Kristen Pfaff, ex-bassist of American rock band Hole
 Hiram Pratt, Mayor of Buffalo
 Bennett C. Riley, US Army General and last military Governor of California
 Charles Rohlfs, American actor, patternmaker, stove designer and furniture maker
 Charles Cary Rumsey, sculptor
 William Findlay Rogers, Mayor of Buffalo, US Representative.
 Jacob F. Schoellkopf (1819—1899), industrialist
 Grace Carew Sheldon (1855–1921), American journalist, author, editor, businesswoman
 Henry K. Smith, Mayor of Buffalo, 1850–51
 Alfred P. Southwick, steam-boat engineer, dentist and inventor of the first electric chair
 Elbridge G. Spaulding, American lawyer, banker, and politician.
 Stanley Spisiak, Conservationist and savior of Lake Erie
 Alfred P. Stone, member of the U.S. House of Representatives
 Mary Burnett Talbert
 Sheldon Thompson, Mayor of Buffalo
 Josiah Trowbridge, physician and Mayor of Buffalo
 George Urban Jr. (1850–1928), businessman
 Richard A. Waite, British-born American architect
 John B. Weber, Civil War colonel and United States Congressman, 1885–89
 Chandler J. Wells, Mayor of Buffalo, 1866–67
 John G. Wickser, New York State Treasurer, 1903–04
 Samuel Wilkeson, industrialist and Mayor of Buffalo
 Joseph Willcocks, former member of the Legislative Assembly of Upper Canada and Major in the Canadian Volunteers (US Army) during the War of 1812
 William Williams, U.S. Representative, railroad executive, banker
 Craig Lehner, Buffalo Police Officer
 17 unidentified victims of the Angola Horror
 11 unknown soldiers who died in hospitals in Buffalo during the Civil War

References

External links
 Forest Lawn Cemetery official site

1849 establishments in New York (state)
Cemeteries on the National Register of Historic Places in New York (state)
Geography of Buffalo, New York
Cemeteries in Erie County, New York
Historic districts in Buffalo, New York
Historic districts on the National Register of Historic Places in New York (state)
National Register of Historic Places in Buffalo, New York
Rural cemeteries
Tombs of presidents of the United States